Jonathan Harvey may refer to:

Jonathan Harvey (composer) (1939–2012), British composer
Jonathan Harvey (congressman) (1780–1859), U.S. Representative from New Hampshire
Jonathan Harvey (playwright) (born 1968), English playwright, screenwriter and author
Jonathan Harvey (cricketer) (born 1944), English cricketer
Jonathan David Harvey, comedian and satirical UK parliament candidate, standing as Count Binface and formerly as Lord Buckethead

See also
 Jonathon Harvey (born 1969), English former cricketer